Mangnang Monastery was a Buddhist monastery in western Tibet. Founded in the 1037, it was visited by the British in 1866, who photographed it. The photographs are now part of the Royal Geographical Society. The monastery was probably destroyed in 1959.

References 

Buddhist monasteries in Tibet
Religious organizations established in the 11th century
Destroyed monasteries